Florence "Flo" Anthony is a gossip columnist, syndicated radio host, TV contributor and author.  She is an  African-American reporter who writes for the gossip page of the Philadelphia Sun.  Anthony resides in the East Harlem section of New York City.

Biography
Florence Anthony is a graduate of Howard University.

After working as a publicist for sports legends like Muhammad Ali, Butch Lewis, Michael Spinks, Larry Holmes, Mike McCallum and Matthew Saad Muhammad; Anthony wrote in the mid-1980s entertainment news.

She became the first African-American reporter to work on the gossip column of the New York Post, as well as the first African-American to pen a column in The National Examiner.  An expert on everyone from Michael Jackson and O. J. Simpson to Whitney Houston and Donald Trump, Anthony was a contributor on news magazine shows like Inside Edition, The Insider and Entertainment Tonight.

In the 1990s, Anthony became a gossip girl on The Ricky Lake Show, The Rolonda Watts Show, The Joan Rivers Show, The Geraldo Show, The Sally Jessy Raphael Show, The Tempestt Bledsoe Show, The Gordon Elliott Show, Forgive or Forget, The Leeza Gibbons Show, The Danny Bonaduce Show, The Bertice Berry Show, The Mark Walberg Show, The Vicki Lawrence Show, and The Maury Povich Show. She was also a guest on Court TV, MSNBC, Fox News Channel, CNN and HLN; and The Dini Petty Show and The Camilla Scott Show.

For six seasons, Anthony was a contributor and in time co-host of E! Entertainment's The Gossip Show, a roundtable entertainment news show of gossip columnists.  She also appeared on E! True Hollywood Story episodes on celebrities like La Toya Jackson, Robin Givens, Janet Jackson, Whitney Houston, Bobby Brown and countless others.

Anthony continues to be a fixture in multimedia.  With her own company, Dottie Media Group LLC, Anthony has two syndicated radio shows,  Gossip To Go With Flo and Flo Anthony's Big Apple Buzz, that are distributed in partnership with Superadio.  The shows are heard by over 3 million listeners daily in upwards of 20 radio markets nationwide.

As a writer, Anthony is a regular contributor to the New York Daily News, providing entertainment news stories for its popular Confidential column.  The famed Hollywood insider also has a weekly syndicated column of her own that appears in The New York Amsterdam News, Philadelphia Sunday Sun, BRE Magazine, Columbus Times and Oklahoma Eagle. Anthony also heads up Steven Hoffenberg's PostPublishing.buzz website and is a contributing writer for Residentmagazine. She is also the former publisher/editor-in-chief of Black Noir magazine, as well as editor-in-chief of Black Elegance magazine. 

On TV, she is regularly featured as a guest contributor on TV One (U.S. TV network)'s documentary series Unsung and Unsung: Hollywood.  She also appeared for numerous seasons on TV One's now defunct series Life After. Anthony can also be seen talking breaking news and celebrity culture on multiple cable news shows and local shows like Good Day New York.

As an author, Anthony made her debut in 2000 with her first novel,  Keeping Secrets Telling Lies  Her second tome came 13 years later in 2013, when she inked a book deal with Zane (author)'s Strebor Books to release Deadly Stuff Players. The sequel to that novel, One Last Deadly Pay  was released in 2016 through W. Clark Distribution. Anthony regularly appears at book festivals and expos signing copies of her books.

She also handles personal appearances and publicity for boxing great Michael Spinks.

References

External links
http://www.nydailynews.com/authors?author=Flo-Anthony
http://superadio.com/gossip-on-the-go-with-flo/
http://amsterdamnews.com/staff/florence-anthony/
https://aalbc.com/authors/author.php?author_name=Flo+Anthony
http://www.philly.com/philly/columnists/jenice_armstrong/20140310_On_the_go_with_Flo_Anthony.html
https://www.newswire.com/press-release/steven-hoffenbergs-ny-post-publishing-inc-is-now-postpublishing

Living people
African-American women journalists
African-American journalists
African-American women writers
American women writers
African-American writers
Year of birth missing (living people)
21st-century African-American people
21st-century African-American women